Tretiak or Tretyak ( or Третьяк;  or Трет`як) is a gender-neutral Slavic surname. It may refer to:
Józef Tretiak (1841–1923), Polish writer
Sergiy Tretyak (born 1984), Ukrainian association football player
Serhiy Tretyak (born 1963), Ukrainian association football player
Maksym Tretyak (born 1984), Ukrainian boxer 
Maxim Tretiak (born 1996), Russian ice hockey goaltender, grandson of Vladislav
Vladislav Tretiak (born 1952), Soviet ice hockey goaltender
Vladyslav Tretiak (born 1980), Ukrainian sabre fencer

See also
 
 

Ukrainian-language surnames